The National Independent Broadcasters was an industry trade group representing the interests of for-profit, over-the-air, non-network-affiliated radio broadcasters in the United States. 

It was originally created in 1939 as part of the larger National Association of Broadcasters.  In 1941, it split off from that organization to become fully independent.  It represented some 200 independent radio stations (out of 800 total in the nation) that were not affiliated with any network.   Its activity seems to have diminished after 1943.

The president of the National Independent Broadcasters was Harold A. Lafount.

See also 
 National Federation of Community Broadcasters

References 

Radio organizations in the United States
Trade associations based in the United States
Organizations established in 1939
Defunct organizations based in the United States
1939 establishments in the United States
Mass media companies